All the Lights in the Sky is the debut album by the English rock band Area 11. Released on 31 January 2013, the album was originally available exclusively on digital format, however as the band grew they began to distribute limited edition physical copies of the album. All The Lights in the Sky was written and produced entirely by the band themselves and released independently. Despite the band's strictly independent status, the album was a success and spawned a number of sell-out tours across the UK. The album's name, as well as the track Heaven-Piercing Giga Drill, are a direct reference to the Japanese anime series Gurren Lagann.

Recording
The band formed in 2010 in Nottingham, England. After releasing their debut EP Blackline the following year, they gained the attention of the popular YouTube broadcasting group The Yogscast, Tom Clarke (Sparkles*) and guitarist Alex Parvis, and were then contracted as audio/video producers by the group. Shortly after this the band began to record their debut album, and documented its progress in a three-part YouTube series.

The band released the album digitally on 31 January 2013. YouTube singing sensation Beckii Cruel appeared as a guest vocalist on the track "Shi No Barado", which was released as the first single from the album.

Track listing

Note: As a hidden track, the a reworked version of the 4th movement of Bōsōzoku Symphonic, "All the Lights in the Sky" is placed in the pregap of the first track on the CD release of the album. It can also be found on the digital disc 4 of the [COMPLETE] re-issue of the album. Additionally, an off-vocal version of this track appears on the second disc of [COMPLETE] re-issue in place of Bōsōzoku Symphonic.

Personnel

Area 11 
 Sparkles* – vocals; guitar; keytar; synthesizer
 Alex Parvis – guitar; vocals
 Jonathan Kogan – bass guitar; vocals; saxophone
 Leo Taylor – percussion; vocals

Additional musicians 
 Beckii Cruel – dialogue on "System;Start, vocals on "Shi no Barado"
 Luke Owens – guitar on "Euphemia"
 Martyn Littlewood – dialogue on "System;Start"
 Kaeyi Dream –  dialogue on "System;Start"
 Sam Thorne – dialogue on "System;Start"

Production 
 Sparkles* & Area 11 – engineering
 Phil Davies – additional engineering
 Sparkles* & Phil Davies – mixing
 Peter Van 'T Riet – mastering

Design 
 Adam Davis – artwork
 Sparkles* – sleeve and booklet design

Additional releases
A re-release of the album, called "All The Lights in the Sky [COMPLETE]" was available for pre-order on 19 December 2013 and released on 13 January 2014. While the purchase contained an original copy of the physical disc, the digital download consisted of 4 11-tracks discs. Discs 2 and 3 were off-vocal and commentary versions of the original album tracks, respectively, while disc 4 contained demos, extended/updated songs, and "The Legendary Sannin," a song from their previous release, Blackline and the B-side to the single "Shi No Barado."

Commercial performance
Considering the band's size, the album was a commercial success, charting at number 75 on the UK Albums Chart and selling over 12,000 copies worldwide.

References

Area 11 (band) albums